Ilkley Playhouse is a live theatre in Ilkley, Bradford, England. It is owned and run by Ilkley Players Ltd a not-for-profit charitable organisation.  Ilkley Playhouse is run by an Executive Committee and is staffed almost entirely by volunteers drawn from its membership.

Ilkley Playhouse is dedicated to the presentation of live amateur theatre and other arts activities within the community and welcomes members and visitors to a season of eight main-house and two studio productions per annum, plus many other events including touring productions and special events.  It also hosts community arts events such as the Ilkley Film Society and the Ilkley Literature Festival.  Ilkley Players Ltd is a member of the Little Theatre Guild of Great Britain. (LTG)

The Ilkley Playhouse also runs Greenroom classes for younger students who annually perform their 
own production.

In October 2020, during the COVID-19 pandemic, Ilkley Playhouse was awarded a much-needed grant from Arts Council England of £60,454.

References

External links 

 Ilkley Playhouse

Theatre companies in England
Ilkley
Community theatre
Little Theatre Guild of Great Britain